Demir Hisar may refer to:
 Demir Hisar (region), a region in North Macedonia
 Demir Hisar (town), a town in North Macedonia
 Demir Hisar Municipality, a municipality in North Macedonia
 Demirhisar, former Turkish name of Sidirokastro, a town in Greece
 , a Turkish merchant ship in service 1938-85

See also 
 Demirhisar (disambiguation)